The Charles N. Vilas Bridge is a  two-span concrete deck arch bridge over the Connecticut River between Bellows Falls, Vermont and North Walpole, New Hampshire. It was built in 1930 and has been closed since March 19, 2009.

History
Colonel Enoch Hale built a wooden covered toll bridge on this site in 1784, the first bridge over the Connecticut River. The toll was 3¢ for a man on horseback, double if he were in a chaise. If he were in a two-horse chaise, the toll was 20¢. Captain Isaac Damon replaced it with the lattice truss Tucker Toll Bridge in 1840. He built lattice truss covered bridges all over New England and New York, including 11 over the Connecticut River.

The Vilas Bridge was built in 1930, rehabilitated in 1974, and closed on March 19, 2009. It is a two-span, concrete arch bridge with open spandrels and "turned" concrete bolsters holding up its railing. A plaque is mounted on the bridge containing a section of "The Bridge Builder" by Will Allen Dromgoole.

The bridge was named in honor of Charles Nathaniel Vilas of Alstead, New Hampshire, who donated funds for its construction. Vilas was a philanthropist who had owned and managed a hotel on Fifth Avenue in New York City; he died in 1931 at the age of 78.

Rehabilitation effort

The condition of this bridge has been a concern of the community for some time because it has been crumbling. New Hampshire delayed repairs due to financial restrictions on the New Hampshire Department of Transportation (NHDoT). The Vermont Agency of Transportation (VTrans) has made overtures to the NHDoT to get the bridge open sooner, as the NHDoT was in the middle of a financial crisis. VTrans' commissioner Brian Searles made the offer to Chris Clement at the NHDoT in December 2013 to front the repair money if NHDoT would fund Vermont's part of other repairs later.

Opponents of repair state that there are other bridges nearby which serve this community, so the Vilas Bridge is not needed, while other bridges without any nearby alternatives are also in need of maintenance. New Hampshire rejected Vermont's offer.

New Hampshire bill HB 1205 was created in 2014 to split the estimated $5M repair cost evenly with Vermont, instead of the usual 7 percent from Vermont and 93 percent from New Hampshire by ownership percentage. Further action will mean putting the Vilas Bridge back on New Hampshire's 10-year plan, which requires New Hampshire legislative action.

In 2021, Rockingham, Vermont, researched whether federal funds were available to help pay for repairs. New Hampshire has about $10 million budgeted for repairs as part of their 10-year plan.

See also 
 List of crossings of the Connecticut River

References

Bibliography
 
 

Bridges over the Connecticut River
Buildings and structures in Bellows Falls, Vermont
Walpole, New Hampshire
Bridges completed in 1930
Bridges in Cheshire County, New Hampshire
Bridges in Windham County, Vermont
Road bridges in New Hampshire
Road bridges in Vermont
Concrete bridges in the United States
Open-spandrel deck arch bridges in the United States
Lattice truss bridges in the United States
Interstate vehicle bridges in the United States